Gerald McMahon (born 13 May 1957) is an Australian fencer. He competed in the individual foil event at the 2000 Summer Olympics.

References

External links
 

1957 births
Living people
Australian male fencers
Olympic fencers of Australia
Fencers at the 2000 Summer Olympics
People from the South West (Western Australia)
Sportsmen from Western Australia